Saint-Liguori is a municipality in the Montcalm Regional County Municipality in the Lanaudière region of Quebec, Canada.

Demographics
Population:
 Population in 2021: 2066 (2016 to 2021 population change: 6.3%)
 Population in 2016: 1943
 Population in 2011: 1976 
 Population in 2006: 1887
 Population in 2001: 1793
 Population in 1996: 1730
 Population in 1991: 1506

Private dwellings occupied by usual residents: 856 (total dwellings: 901)

Mother tongue:
 English as first language: 1.6%
 French as first language: 97.9%
 English and French as first language: 0%
 Other as first language: 0.5%

Education

Commission scolaire des Samares operates francophone public schools, including:
 École Saint-Joseph

The Sir Wilfrid Laurier School Board operates anglophone public schools, including:
 Joliette Elementary School in Saint-Charles-Borromée
 Joliette High School in Joliette

References

External links
 MRC de Montcalm - Saint-Liguori

Municipalities in Quebec
Incorporated places in Lanaudière